Dinosaurs are a diverse group of reptiles of the clade Dinosauria. They first appeared during the Triassic period, between 243 and 233.23 million years ago, although the exact origin and timing of the evolution of dinosaurs is the subject of active research. They became the dominant terrestrial vertebrates after the Triassic–Jurassic extinction event 201.3 million years ago; their dominance continued throughout the Jurassic and Cretaceous periods. The fossil record demonstrates that birds are modern feathered dinosaurs, having evolved from earlier theropods during the Late Jurassic epoch. Birds were therefore the only dinosaur lineage to survive the Cretaceous–Paleogene extinction event approximately 66 million years ago. Dinosaurs can be divided into avian dinosaurs (birds) and non-avian dinosaurs, which are all dinosaurs other than birds.

This list of dinosaurs is a comprehensive listing of all genera that have ever been considered to be non-avian dinosaurs, but also includes some dinosaurs of disputed status (avian? or non-avian?, where "avian" refers to the clade Avialae), as well as purely vernacular terms.

The list includes all commonly accepted genera, but also genera that are now considered invalid, doubtful (nomen dubium), or were not formally published (nomen nudum), as well as junior synonyms of more established names, and genera that are no longer considered dinosaurs. Many listed names have been reclassified as everything from true birds to crocodilians to petrified wood. The list contains 1740 names, of which approximately 1304 are considered either valid dinosaur genera or nomina dubia.

Scope and terminology 
There is no official, canonical list of all non-avian dinosaur genera. The closest is the Dinosaur Genera List, compiled by biological nomenclature expert George Olshevsky, which was first published online in 1995 and was regularly updated until June 2021. The most authoritative general source in the field is the second (2004) edition of The Dinosauria. The vast majority of names listed below are sourced to Olshevsky's list, and all subjective determinations (such as junior synonymy or non-dinosaurian status) are based on The Dinosauria, except where they conflict with primary literature. These exceptions are noted.

Naming conventions and terminology follow the International Code of Zoological Nomenclature. Technical terms used include:
 Junior synonym: A name which describes the same taxon as a previously published name. If two or more genera are formally designated and the type specimens are later assigned to the same genus, the first to be published (in chronological order) is the senior synonym, and all other instances are junior synonyms. Senior synonyms are generally used, except by special decision of the ICZN (see Tyrannosaurus), but junior synonyms cannot be used again for a different genus, even if deprecated. Junior synonymy is often subjective, unless the genera described were both based on the same type specimen.
 Nomen nudum (Latin for "naked name"): A name that has appeared in print but has not yet been formally published by the standards of the ICZN. Nomina nuda (the plural form) are invalid, and are therefore not italicized as a proper generic name would be. If the name is later formally published, that name is no longer a nomen nudum and will be italicized on this list. Often, the formally published name will differ from any nomina nuda that describe the same specimen.
 Nomen oblitum (Latin for "forgotten name"): A name that has not been used in the scientific community for more than fifty years after its original proposal.
 Nomen manuscriptum (Latin for "manuscript name"): A name that appears in manuscript of a formal publication that has no scientific backing.
 Preoccupied name: A name that is formally published, but which has already been used for another taxon. This second use is invalid (as are all subsequent uses) and the name must be replaced. Preoccupied names are not valid generic names.
 Nomen dubium (Latin for "dubious name"): A name describing a fossil with no unique diagnostic features. As this can be an extremely subjective and controversial designation (see Hadrosaurus), no genera should be marked as such on this list.

A

 Aachenosaurus – subsequently found to be a piece of petrified wood
 Aardonyx
 "Abdallahsaurus" – nomen nudum, synonym of Giraffatitan
 Abdarainurus
 Abditosaurus
 Abelisaurus
 Abrictosaurus
 Abrosaurus
 Abydosaurus
 Acantholipan
 Acanthopholis
 Achelousaurus
 Acheroraptor
 Achillesaurus 
 Achillobator
 Acristavus
 Acrocanthosaurus

 Acrotholus
 Actiosaurus – subsequently found to be a choristoderan
 Adamantisaurus
 Adasaurus
 Adelolophus
 Adeopapposaurus
 Adratiklit
 Adynomosaurus
 Aegyptosaurus
 Aeolosaurus
 Aepisaurus
 Aepyornithomimus
 Aerosteon
 Aetonyx – junior synonym of Massospondylus
 Afromimus
 Afrovenator
 Agathaumas – possible synonym of Triceratops
 Aggiosaurus – subsequently found to be a metriorhynchid crocodilian
 Agilisaurus
 Agnosphitys – possibly non-dinosaurian
 Agrosaurus – probably a junior synonym of Thecodontosaurus
 Agujaceratops
 Agustinia
 Ahshislepelta
 "Airakoraptor" – nomen nudum; Kuru
 Ajancingenia – synonym of Heyuannia
 Ajkaceratops
 Ajnabia
 Akainacephalus
 Alamosaurus
 Alaskacephale
 Albalophosaurus
 Albertaceratops
 Albertadromeus
 Albertavenator
 Albertonykus
 Albertosaurus
 Albinykus
 Albisaurus – subsequently found to be a non-dinosaurian reptile
 Alcovasaurus – possible junior synonym of Miragaia
 Alectrosaurus
 Aletopelta

 Algoasaurus
 Alioramus
 Aliwalia – junior synonym of Eucnemesaurus
 Allosaurus
 Almas
 Alnashetri
 Alocodon
 Altirhinus
 Altispinax
 Alvarezsaurus
 Alwalkeria
 Alxasaurus
 Amanzia
 Amargasaurus
 "Amargastegos" – nomen nudum
 Amargatitanis
 Amazonsaurus
 Ambopteryx 
 Ammosaurus – junior synonym of Anchisaurus
 Ampelosaurus
 Amphicoelias
 "Amphicoelicaudia" – nomen nudum; synonym of Huabeisaurus
 "Amphisaurus" – preoccupied name, now known as Anchisaurus
 Amtocephale
 Amtosaurus – possibly a junior synonym of Talarurus
 Amurosaurus
 Amygdalodon
 Anabisetia
 Analong
 Anasazisaurus
 Anatosaurus – junior synonym of Edmontosaurus
 Anatotitan – junior synonym of Edmontosaurus
 Anchiceratops
 Anchiornis
 Anchisaurus
 Andesaurus

 "Andhrasaurus" – nomen nudum
 Angaturama – possible junior synonym of Irritator
 "Angloposeidon" – nomen nudum
 Angolatitan
 Angulomastacator
 Anhuilong
 Aniksosaurus
 Animantarx
 Ankistrodon – subsequently found to be a proterosuchid archosauriform
 Ankylosaurus
 Anodontosaurus
 Anomalipes
 Anoplosaurus
 Anserimimus
 Antarctopelta
 Antarctosaurus
 Antetonitrus
 Anthodon – subsequently found to be a pareiasaur
 Antrodemus – possibly a synonym of Allosaurus
 Anzu
 Aoniraptor
 Aorun
 Apatodon – possibly a junior synonym of Allosaurus
 Apatoraptor
 Apatosaurus
 Appalachiosaurus
 Aquilarhinus
 Aquilops
 Arackar
 Aragosaurus
 Aralosaurus
 Aratasaurus
 "Araucanoraptor" – nomen nudum; Neuquenraptor
 Archaeoceratops
 Archaeodontosaurus

 Archaeopteryx – possibly a bird
 Archaeoraptor – a chimaera of the bird Yanornis and the dromaeosaur Microraptor
 Archaeornis – junior synonym of Archaeopteryx
 Archaeornithoides
 Archaeornithomimus
 Arcovenator
 Arctosaurus – subsequently found to be a non-dinosaurian reptile
 Arcusaurus
 Arenysaurus
 Argentinosaurus
 Argyrosaurus
 Aristosaurus – junior synonym of Massospondylus
 Aristosuchus
 Arizonasaurus – subsequently found to be a rauisuchian
 Arkansaurus 
 Arkharavia
 Arrhinoceratops
 Arrudatitan
 Arstanosaurus
 Asfaltovenator
 Asiaceratops
 Asiamericana – a fish
 Asiatosaurus
 Asilisaurus – possibly non-dinosaurian
 Astrodon
 Astrodonius – junior synonym of Astrodon
 Astrodontaurus – junior synonym of Astrodon
 Astrophocaudia
 Asylosaurus
 Atacamatitan
 Atlantosaurus
 Atlasaurus
 Atlascopcosaurus
 Atrociraptor
 Atsinganosaurus

 Aublysodon
 Aucasaurus
 "Augustia" – preoccupied name, now known as Agustinia
 Augustynolophus
 Auroraceratops
 Aurornis 
 Australodocus
 Australotitan
 Australovenator
 Austrocheirus
 Austroposeidon
 Austroraptor
 Austrosaurus
 Avaceratops
 "Avalonia" – preoccupied name, now known as Avalonianus
 Avalonianus – subsequently found to be a non-dinosaurian archosaur
 Aviatyrannis
 Avimimus
 Avipes – probably a non-dinosaurian dinosauromorph
 Avisaurus – subsequently found to be an enantiornithine bird
 Azendohsaurus – subsequently found to be a non-dinosaurian archosauromorph

B

 Baalsaurus
 Bactrosaurus
 Bagaceratops
 Bagaraatan
 Bagualia
 Bagualosaurus
 Bahariasaurus
 Bainoceratops
 Bajadasaurus
 "Bakesaurus" – nomen nudum; Bactrosaurus
 Balaur – possibly a bird
 "Balochisaurus" – nomen nudum
 Bambiraptor
 Banji
 Bannykus

 Baotianmansaurus
 Barapasaurus
 Barilium
 Barosaurus
 Barrosasaurus
 Barsboldia
 Baryonyx
 Bashanosaurus
 Bashunosaurus
 Basutodon – subsequently found to be a non-dinosaurian archosaur
 Bathygnathus – a pelycosaur, Dimetrodon
 Batyrosaurus
 Baurutitan
 Bayannurosaurus
 "Bayosaurus" – nomen nudum
 Becklespinax – junior synonym of Altispinax
 "Beelemodon" – nomen nudum
 Beg
 Beibeilong 
 Beipiaognathus – chimera of several unnamed dinosaurs
 Beipiaosaurus
 Beishanlong
 Bellusaurus
 Belodon – subsequently found to be a phytosaur
 Berberosaurus
 Berthasaura
 Betasuchus
 Bicentenaria
 Bienosaurus
 "Bihariosaurus" – nomen nudum
 "Bilbeyhallorum" – nomen nudum; Cedarpelta
 Bissektipelta
 Bistahieversor
 Bisticeratops
 "Blancocerosaurus" – nomen nudum, synonym of Giraffatitan
 Blasisaurus
 Blikanasaurus
 Bolong
 Bonapartenykus
 Bonapartesaurus
 Bonatitan
 Bonitasaura
 Borealopelta
 Borealosaurus
 Boreonykus
 Borogovia
 Bothriospondylus
 Brachiosaurus
 Brachyceratops
 Brachylophosaurus
 Brachypodosaurus
 Brachyrophus – junior synonym of Camptosaurus

 Brachytaenius – subsequently found to be a metriorhynchid; junior objective synonym of Dakosaurus or Geosaurus
 Brachytrachelopan
 Bradycneme
 Brasileosaurus – subsequently found to be a non-dinosaurian archosaur
 Brasilotitan
 Bravasaurus
 Bravoceratops
 Breviceratops
 Brighstoneus
 Brohisaurus
 Brontomerus
 "Brontoraptor" – nomen nudum, synonym of Torvosaurus
 Brontosaurus
 Bruhathkayosaurus
 Bugenasaura – junior synonym of Thescelosaurus
 Buitreraptor
 Burianosaurus
 Buriolestes
 "Byranjaffia" – nomen nudum; Byronosaurus
 Byronosaurus

C

 Caenagnathasia
 Caenagnathus
 Caieiria
 Caihong 
 Calamosaurus
 "Calamospondylus" – preoccupied name, now known as Calamosaurus
 Calamospondylus
 Callovosaurus
 Camarasaurus
 Camarillasaurus
 Camelotia
 Camposaurus
 "Camptonotus" – preoccupied name, now known as Camptosaurus
 Camptosaurus
 "Campylodon" – preoccupied name, now known as Campylodoniscus
 Campylodoniscus
 Canardia
 "Capitalsaurus" – nomen nudum
 Carcharodontosaurus
 Cardiodon
 Carnotaurus
 Caseosaurus 
 Cathartesaura
 Cathetosaurus — possibly a species of Camarasaurus

 Caudipteryx
 Caudocoelus – junior synonym of Teinurosaurus
 Caulodon – junior synonym of Camarasaurus
 Cedarosaurus
 Cedarpelta
 Cedrorestes
 Centemodon – subsequently found to be a phytosaur
 Centrosaurus
 Cerasinops
 Ceratonykus
 Ceratops
 Ceratosaurus
 Ceratosuchops
 Cetiosauriscus
 Cetiosaurus
 Changchunsaurus
 "Changdusaurus" – nomen nudum
 Changmiania
 Changyuraptor
 Chaoyangsaurus
 Charonosaurus
 Chasmosaurus
 Chassternbergia – junior synonym of Edmontonia
 Chebsaurus
 Chenanisaurus
 Cheneosaurus – junior synonym of Hypacrosaurus
 Chialingosaurus
 Chiayusaurus
 Chienkosaurus – possible junior synonym of Szechuanosaurus
 "Chihuahuasaurus" – nomen nudum; Sonorasaurus
 Chilantaisaurus
 Chilesaurus
 Chindesaurus 
 Chingkankousaurus
 Chinshakiangosaurus
 Chirostenotes
 Choconsaurus
 Chondrosteosaurus

 Choyrodon
 Chromogisaurus
 Chuandongocoelurus
 Chuanjiesaurus
 Chuanqilong
 Chubutisaurus
 Chucarosaurus
 Chungkingosaurus
 Chuxiongosaurus
 "Cinizasaurus" – nomen nudum
 Cionodon
 Citipati
 Citipes
 Cladeiodon – subsequently found to be a non-dinosaurian rauisuchian; synonym of Teratosaurus
 Claorhynchus – possibly Triceratops
 Claosaurus
 Clarencea – subsequently found to be a sphenosuchian; synonym of Sphenosuchus
 Clasmodosaurus
 Clepsysaurus – subsequently found to be a phytosaur, possibly Palaeosaurus
 Coahuilaceratops
 Coelophysis
 "Coelosaurus" – preoccupied genus name, species "Coelosaurus" antiquus
 Coeluroides
 Coelurosauravus – subsequently found to be a primitive diapsid
 Coelurus
 Colepiocephale
 "Coloradia" – preoccupied name, now known as Coloradisaurus
 Coloradisaurus
 "Colossosaurus" – nomen nudum; Pelorosaurus
 Comahuesaurus
 "Comanchesaurus" – nomen nudum
 Compsognathus

 Compsosuchus
 Concavenator
 Conchoraptor
 Condorraptor
 Convolosaurus
 Coronosaurus
 Corythoraptor
 Corythosaurus
 Craspedodon
 Crataeomus – junior synonym of Struthiosaurus
 Craterosaurus
 Creosaurus – junior synonym of Allosaurus
 Crichtonpelta
 Crichtonsaurus
 Cristatusaurus
 Crittendenceratops
 Crosbysaurus – subsequently found to be a non-dinosaurian archosauriform
 Cruxicheiros
 Cryolophosaurus
 Cryptodraco – junior synonym (unneeded replacement name) of Cryptosaurus
 "Cryptoraptor" – nomen nudum
 Cryptosaurus
 Cryptovolans – junior synonym of Microraptor
 Cumnoria

D

 Daanosaurus
 Dacentrurus
 "Dachongosaurus" – nomen nudum
 Daemonosaurus 
 Dahalokely
 Dakosaurus – subsequently found to be a metriorhynchid crocodilian
 Dakotadon
 Dakotaraptor
 Daliansaurus
 "Damalasaurus" – nomen nudum
 Dandakosaurus
 Danubiosaurus – junior synonym of Struthiosaurus
 "Daptosaurus" – nomen nudum; early manuscript name for Deinonychus
 Darwinsaurus – junior synonym of Hypselospinus or Mantellisaurus
 Dashanpusaurus
 Daspletosaurus
 Dasygnathoides – subsequently found to be a non-dinosaurian archosaur; possible junior synonym of Ornithosuchus
 "Dasygnathus" – preoccupied name, now known as Dasygnathoides
 Datanglong

 Datonglong
 Datousaurus
 Daurlong
 Daurosaurus – synonym of Kulindadromeus
 Daxiatitan
 Deinocheirus
 Deinodon – possibly Gorgosaurus
 Deinonychus
 Delapparentia – junior synonym of Iguanodon
 Deltadromeus
 Demandasaurus
 Denversaurus
 Deuterosaurus – subsequently found to be a therapsid
 Diabloceratops
Diamantinasaurus
 Dianchungosaurus – subsequently found to be a crocodilian
 "Diceratops" – preoccupied name, now known as Nedoceratops
 Diceratus – junior synonym of Nedoceratops
 Diclonius
 Dicraeosaurus
 Didanodon – synonym of Lambeosaurus; possibly a nomen nudum
 Dilong
 Dilophosaurus
 Diluvicursor
 Dimodosaurus – junior synonym of Plateosaurus
 Dineobellator
 Dinheirosaurus – possible junior synonym of Supersaurus
 Dinodocus
 "Dinosaurus" – preoccupied name for a junior synonym of Brithopus; now a junior synonym of Plateosaurus

 Dinotyrannus – junior synonym Tyrannosaurus or some other tyrannosaurid
 Diodorus – possibly non-dinosaurian
 Diplodocus
 Diplotomodon
 Diracodon – junior synonym of Stegosaurus
 Dolichosuchus
 Dollodon – junior synonym of Mantellisaurus
 "Domeykosaurus" – nomen nudum, synonym of Arackar
 Dongbeititan
 Dongyangopelta
 Dongyangosaurus
 Doratodon – subsequently found to be a crocodilian
 Doryphorosaurus – junior synonym (unneeded replacement name) of Kentrosaurus
 Draconyx
 Dracopelta
 Dracoraptor
 Dracorex – junior synonym of Pachycephalosaurus
 Dracovenator
 Dravidosaurus – possibly non-dinosaurian
 Dreadnoughtus
 Drinker – junior synonym of Nanosaurus
 Dromaeosauroides
 Dromaeosaurus
 Dromiceiomimus 
 Dromicosaurus – junior synonym of Massospondylus
 Drusilasaura
 Dryosaurus

 Dryptosauroides
 Dryptosaurus
 Dubreuillosaurus
 "Duranteceratops" – nomen nudum
 Duriatitan
 Duriavenator
 Dynamosaurus – junior synonym of Tyrannosaurus
 Dynamoterror
 Dyoplosaurus
 Dysalotosaurus
 Dysganus
 Dyslocosaurus
 Dystrophaeus
 Dystylosaurus – junior synonym of Supersaurus
Dzharaonyx
Dzharatitanis

E

 Echinodon
 Edmarka – junior synonym of Torvosaurus
 Edmontonia
 Edmontosaurus
 Efraasia

 Einiosaurus
 Ekrixinatosaurus
 Elachistosuchus – subsequently found to be a rhynchocephalian
 Elaltitan
 Elaphrosaurus
 Elemgasem
 Elmisaurus
 Elopteryx
 Elosaurus – junior synonym of Brontosaurus
 Elrhazosaurus
 "Elvisaurus" – nomen nudum; Cryolophosaurus
 Emausaurus
 Embasaurus
 Enigmosaurus
 Eoabelisaurus
 Eobrontosaurus – junior synonym of Brontosaurus
 Eocarcharia
 Eoceratops – junior synonym of Chasmosaurus
 Eocursor
 Eodromaeus
 "Eohadrosaurus" – nomen nudum; Eolambia
 Eolambia
 Eomamenchisaurus
 "Eoplophysis" – nomen nudum
 Eoraptor
 Eosinopteryx 
 Eotrachodon
 Eotriceratops
 Eotyrannus
 Eousdryosaurus
 Epachthosaurus
 Epanterias – may be Allosaurus
 "Ephoenosaurus" – nomen nudum; Machimosaurus (a crocodilian)
 Epicampodon – subsequently found to be a proterosuchid archosauriform, Ankistrodon
 Epichirostenotes
 Epidendrosaurus – synonym of Scansoriopteryx
 Epidexipteryx 
 Equijubus
 Erectopus
 Erketu

 Erliansaurus
 Erlikosaurus
 Erythrovenator
 Eshanosaurus
 "Euacanthus" – nomen nudum; junior synonym of Polacanthus
 Eucamerotus
 Eucentrosaurus – junior synonym (unneeded replacement name) of Centrosaurus
 Eucercosaurus
 Eucnemesaurus
 Eucoelophysis – possibly non-dinosaurian
 "Eugongbusaurus" – nomen nudum
 Euhelopus
 Euoplocephalus
 Eupodosaurus – subsequently found to be a nothosaur synonymous with Lariosaurus
 "Eureodon" – nomen nudum; Tenontosaurus
 Eurolimnornis – subsequently found to be a pterosaur
 Euronychodon
 Europasaurus
 Europatitan
 Europelta
 Euskelosaurus
 Eustreptospondylus

F

 Fabrosaurus – possibly Lesothosaurus
 Falcarius
 "Fendusaurus" – nomen nudum
 "Fenestrosaurus" – nomen nudum; Oviraptor
 Ferganasaurus
 "Ferganastegos" – nomen nudum
 Ferganocephale
 Ferrisaurus
 Foraminacephale
 Fosterovenator
 Fostoria
 Frenguellisaurus – junior synonym of Herrerasaurus

 Fruitadens
 Fukuiraptor
 Fukuisaurus
 Fukuititan
 Fukuivenator
 Fulengia
 Fulgurotherium
 Fushanosaurus
 "Fusinasus" – nomen nudum; Eotyrannus
 Fusuisaurus
 "Futabasaurus" – nomen nudum; not to be confused with the formally named plesiosaur Futabasaurus
 Futalognkosaurus
Fylax

G

 "Gadolosaurus" – nomen nudum
 Galeamopus
 Galesaurus – subsequently found to be a therapsid
 Galleonosaurus
 Gallimimus
 Galtonia – subsequently found to be a pseudosuchian; possibly a junior synonym of Revueltosaurus
 Galveosaurus – synonym of Galvesaurus
 Galvesaurus
 Gamatavus — possibly non-dinosaurian
 Gannansaurus
 "Gansutitan" – nomen nudum; Daxiatitan
 Ganzhousaurus
 Gargoyleosaurus
 Garrigatitan
 Garudimimus
 Gasosaurus

 Gasparinisaura
 Gastonia
 "Gavinosaurus" – nomen nudum; Eotyrannus
 Geminiraptor
 Genusaurus
 Genyodectes
 Geranosaurus
 Gideonmantellia
 Giganotosaurus
 Gigantoraptor
 "Gigantosaurus" – preoccupied name, now known as Tornieria
 Gigantosaurus
 Gigantoscelus – Probable junior synonym of Euskelosaurus
 Gigantspinosaurus
 Gilmoreosaurus
 "Ginnareemimus" – nomen nudum; Kinnareemimus
 Giraffatitan
 Glacialisaurus
 Glishades
 Glyptodontopelta
 Gnathovorax 
 Gobiceratops – possibly a junior synonym of Bagaceratops
 Gobihadros
 Gobiraptor
 Gobisaurus
 Gobititan
 Gobivenator
 "Godzillasaurus" – nomen nudum; Gojirasaurus
 Gojirasaurus
 Gondwanatitan
 Gongbusaurus
 Gongpoquansaurus
 Gongxianosaurus
 Gorgosaurus
 Goyocephale

 Graciliceratops
 Graciliraptor
 Gracilisuchus – subsequently found to be a non-dinosaurian archosaur
 Gravitholus
 Gresslyosaurus – possible junior synonym of Plateosaurus
 Griphornis – junior synonym of Archaeopteryx
 Griphosaurus – junior synonym of Archaeopteryx
 Gryphoceratops
 Gryponyx
 Gryposaurus
 "Gspsaurus" – nomen nudum
 Guaibasaurus
 Gualicho
 Guanlong
 Guemesia
 Gwyneddosaurus – subsequently found to be a tanystrophid
 Gyposaurus – possibly a junior synonym of Massospondylus

H

 "Hadrosauravus" – nomen nudum; junior synonym of Gryposaurus
 Hadrosaurus
 Haestasaurus
 Hagryphus
 Hallopus – subsequently found to be a crocodylomorph
 Halszkaraptor
 Halticosaurus
 Hamititan
 Hanssuesia
 "Hanwulosaurus" – nomen nudum
 Haplocanthosaurus
 "Haplocanthus" – preoccupied name, now known as Haplocanthosaurus
 Haplocheirus
 Harpymimus
 Haya
 Hecatasaurus – junior synonym of Telmatosaurus
 "Heilongjiangosaurus" – nomen nudum
 Heishansaurus
 Helioceratops

 "Helopus" – preoccupied name, now known as Euhelopus
 Heptasteornis
 Herbstosaurus – subsequently found to be a pterosaur
 Herrerasaurus 
 Hesperonychus
 Hesperornithoides
 Hesperosaurus
 Heterodontosaurus
 Heterosaurus – possible synonym of Mantellisaurus
 Hexing
 Hexinlusaurus
 Heyuannia
 Hierosaurus
 Hikanodon – junior synonym of Iguanodon
 Hippodraco
 "Hironosaurus" – nomen nudum
 "Hisanohamasaurus" – nomen nudum
 Histriasaurus
 Homalocephale
 "Honghesaurus" – nomen nudum later described as Yandusaurus; name later used for a genus of marine reptile
 Hongshanosaurus – junior synonym of Psittacosaurus
 Hoplitosaurus
 Hoplosaurus – junior synonym of Struthiosaurus
 Horshamosaurus
 Hortalotarsus – possible junior synonym of Massospondylus
 Huabeisaurus
 Hualianceratops
 Huallasaurus
 Huanansaurus
 Huanghetitan
 Huangshanlong
 Huaxiagnathus
 Huaxiaosaurus – junior synonym of Shantungosaurus
 "Huaxiasaurus" – nomen nudum; Huaxiagnathus
 Huayangosaurus
 Hudiesaurus
 Huehuecanauhtlus

 Huinculsaurus
 Hulsanpes 
 Hungarosaurus
 Huxleysaurus – junior synonym of Hypselospinus
 Hylaeosaurus
 Hylosaurus – junior synonym of Hylaeosaurus
 Hypacrosaurus
 Hypselorhachis – subsequently found to be a ctenosauriscid
 Hypselosaurus
 Hypselospinus
 Hypsibema
 Hypsilophodon
 Hypsirhophus

I

 Iberospinus
 Ibirania
 "Ichabodcraniosaurus" – nomen nudum; Shri
 Ichthyovenator
 Ignavusaurus
 Ignotosaurus – possibly non-dinosaurian
 Iguanacolossus
 Iguanodon
 "Iguanoides" – nomen nudum; Iguanodon
 "Iguanosaurus" – nomen nudum; Iguanodon
 Iliosuchus
 Ilokelesia
 Imperobator
 Incisivosaurus
 Indosaurus
 Indosuchus
 "Ingenia" – preoccupied name, now known as Heyuannia yanshini
 Ingentia
 Inosaurus 
 Invictarx
 Irisosaurus

 Irritator
 Isaberrysaura
 Isanosaurus
 Isasicursor
 Ischioceratops
 Ischisaurus – junior synonym of Herrerasaurus
 "Ischyrosaurus" – preoccupied genus name, species Ischyrosaurus manseli
 Isisaurus
 "Issasaurus" – nomen nudum; Dicraeosaurus
 Issi
 Itapeuasaurus
 Itemirus
 Iuticosaurus
 Iyuku

J

 Jainosaurus
 Jakapil
 Jaklapallisaurus
 Janenschia
 Jaxartosaurus
 Jeholosaurus
 Jenghizkhan – junior synonym of Tarbosaurus
 "Jensenosaurus" – nomen nudum; Supersaurus
 Jeyawati
 Jianchangosaurus
 "Jiangjunmiaosaurus" – nomen nudum; Monolophosaurus
 Jiangjunosaurus
 Jiangshanosaurus

 Jiangxisaurus
 Jianianhualong 
 Jinbeisaurus
 Jinfengopteryx
 Jingshanosaurus
 Jintasaurus
 Jinyunpelta
 Jinzhousaurus
 Jiutaisaurus
 Jobaria
 Jubbulpuria
 Judiceratops
 Jurapteryx – junior synonym of Archaeopteryx
 "Jurassosaurus" – nomen nudum; Tianchisaurus
 Juratyrant
 Juravenator

K

 Kaatedocus
 "Kagasaurus" – nomen nudum
 Kaijiangosaurus
 Kaijutitan
 Kakuru
 Kamuysaurus
 Kangnasaurus
 Kansaignathus
 Karongasaurus
 Katepensaurus
 "Katsuyamasaurus" – nomen nudum
Kayentavenator
 Kazaklambia
 Kelmayisaurus
 Kelumapusaura
 Kemkemia – subsequently found to be a crocodyliform
 Kentrosaurus
 Kentrurosaurus – junior synonym (unneeded replacement name) of Kentrosaurus
 Kerberosaurus

 Khaan
 "Khetranisaurus" – nomen nudum
 Kholumolumo
 Khulsanurus
 Kileskus
 Kinnareemimus
 "Kitadanisaurus" – nomen nudum; Fukuiraptor
 "Kittysaurus" – nomen nudum; Eotyrannus
 Klamelisaurus 
 Kol
 Koparion
 Koreaceratops
 Koreanosaurus
 "Koreanosaurus" – nomen nudum; name later used formally for a genus of ornithopod
 Koshisaurus
 Kosmoceratops
 Kotasaurus
 Koutalisaurus – possible junior synonym of Pararhabdodon
 Kritosaurus
 Kryptops
 Krzyzanowskisaurus  – probably a pseudosuchian (Revueltosaurus?)
 Kukufeldia – junior synonym of Barilium
 Kulceratops
 Kulindadromeus
 Kulindapteryx – synonym of Kulindadromeus
 Kunbarrasaurus
 Kundurosaurus
 "Kunmingosaurus" – nomen nudum
 Kuru
 Kurupi
 Kuszholia – probably a bird
 Kwanasaurus – possibly non-dinosaurian

L

 Labocania
 Labrosaurus – junior synonym of Allosaurus

 "Laelaps" – preoccupied name, now known as Dryptosaurus
 Laevisuchus
 Lagerpeton – subsequently found to be a non-dinosaurian pterosauromorph
 Lagosuchus – subsequently found to be a non-dinosaurian dinosauromorph
 Laiyangosaurus
 Lajasvenator
 Lamaceratops – possible junior synonym of Bagaceratops
 Lambeosaurus
 Lametasaurus 
 Lamplughsaura
 Lanasaurus – junior synonym of Lycorhinus
 "Lancangosaurus" – variant spelling of "Lancanjiangosaurus"
 "Lancanjiangosaurus"  – nomen nudum
 Lanzhousaurus
 Laosaurus
 Lapampasaurus
 Laplatasaurus
 Lapparentosaurus
 Laquintasaura
 Latenivenatrix – possible junior synonym of Stenonychosaurus
 Latirhinus
 Lavocatisaurus
 Leaellynasaura
 Ledumahadi
 Leinkupal
 Leipsanosaurus – junior synonym of Struthiosaurus
 "Lengosaurus" – nomen nudum; Eotyrannus
 Leonerasaurus
 Lepidocheirosaurus — junior synonym of Kulindadromeus
 Lepidus

 Leptoceratops
 Leptorhynchos
 Leptospondylus – junior synonym of Massospondylus
 Leshansaurus
 Lesothosaurus
 Lessemsaurus
 Levnesovia
 Lewisuchus – possibly non-dinosaurian
 Lexovisaurus
 Leyesaurus
 Liaoceratops
 Liaoningosaurus
 Liaoningotitan 
 Liaoningvenator 
 "Liassaurus" – nomen nudum; possible synonym of Sarcosaurus
 Libycosaurus – subsequently found to be an anthracothere mammal
 Ligabueino
 Ligabuesaurus
 "Ligomasaurus" – nomen nudum, synonym of Giraffatitan
 "Likhoelesaurus" – nomen nudum; possibly non-dinosaurian
 Liliensternus
 Limaysaurus
 "Limnornis" – preoccupied name, now known as Palaeocursornis ( a pterosaur)
 "Limnosaurus" – preoccupied name, now known as Telmatosaurus
 Limusaurus
 Lingwulong
 Lingyuanosaurus
 Linhenykus
 Linheraptor
 Linhevenator

 Lirainosaurus
 Lisboasaurus – subsequently found to be a crocodilian
 Liubangosaurus
 Llukalkan
 Lohuecotitan
 Loncosaurus
 Longisquama – subsequently found to be a non-dinosaurian reptile
 Longosaurus – junior synonym of Coelophysis
 Lophorhothon
 Lophostropheus
 Loricatosaurus
 Loricosaurus
 Losillasaurus
 Lourinhanosaurus
 Lourinhasaurus
 Luanchuanraptor
 "Luanpingosaurus" – nomen nudum; Psittacosaurus
 Lucianosaurus – subsequently found to be a non-dinosaurian archosauriform
 Lucianovenator 
 Lufengosaurus
 Lukousaurus – possibly a crurotarsan
 Luoyanggia
 Lurdusaurus
 Lusitanosaurus
 Lusotitan
 Lusovenator
 Lutungutali – possibly non-dinosaurian
 Lycorhinus
 Lythronax

M

 Macelognathus – subsequently found to be a sphenosuchian crocodilian
 Machairasaurus
 Machairoceratops
 Macrocollum
 Macrodontophion – subsequently found to be a member of Lophotrochozoa
 Macrogryphosaurus
 Macrophalangia – junior synonym of Chirostenotes

 "Macroscelosaurus" – nomen nudum; junior synonym of Tanystropheus
 Macrurosaurus
 "Madsenius" – nomen nudum, Allosaurus
 Magnamanus
 Magnapaulia
 Magnirostris – possible junior synonym of Bagaceratops
 Magnosaurus
 "Magulodon" – nomen nudum
 Magyarosaurus
 Mahakala
 Mahuidacursor
 Maiasaura
 Maip
 Majungasaurus
 Majungatholus – junior synonym of Majungasaurus
 Malarguesaurus
 Malawisaurus
 Maleevosaurus – junior synonym of Tarbosaurus
 Maleevus
 Malefica
 Mamenchisaurus
 Mandschurosaurus
 Manidens
 Manospondylus – synonym of Tyrannosaurus
 Mansourasaurus
 Mantellisaurus
 Mantellodon – junior synonym of Mantellisaurus
 "Maojandino" – nomen nudum
 Mapusaurus
 Maraapunisaurus
 Marasuchus – subsequently found to be a non-dinosaurian dinosauromorph
 "Marisaurus" – nomen nudum
 Marmarospondylus
 Marshosaurus
 Martharaptor
 Masiakasaurus
 Massospondylus

 Matheronodon
 Maxakalisaurus
 Mbiresaurus
 Medusaceratops
 "Megacervixosaurus" – nomen nudum
 "Megadactylus" – preoccupied name, now known as Anchisaurus
 "Megadontosaurus" – nomen nudum; Microvenator
 Megalosaurus
 Megapnosaurus – possible junior synonym of Coelophysis
 Megaraptor
 Mei
 Melanorosaurus
 Mendozasaurus
 Menefeeceratops
 Menucocelsior
 Meraxes
 Mercuriceratops
 Meroktenos
 Metriacanthosaurus
 "Microcephale" – nomen nudum
 "Microceratops" – preoccupied name, now known as Microceratus
 Microceratus
 Microcoelus
 "Microdontosaurus" – nomen nudum
 Microhadrosaurus
 Micropachycephalosaurus
 Microraptor
 Microvenator
 Mierasaurus
 "Mifunesaurus" – nomen nudum
 Minmi
 Minotaurasaurus 
 Miragaia
 Mirischia
 Mnyamawamtuka
 Moabosaurus
 Mochlodon
 "Mohammadisaurus" – nomen nudum; Tornieria

 Mojoceratops – junior synonym of Chasmosaurus
 Mongolosaurus
 Mongolostegus
 Monkonosaurus
 Monoclonius
 Monolophosaurus
 "Mononychus" – preoccupied name, now known as Mononykus
 Mononykus
 Montanoceratops
 Morelladon
 Morinosaurus
 Moros
 Morosaurus – junior synonym of Camarasaurus
 Morrosaurus
 Mosaiceratops
 "Moshisaurus" – nomen nudum; possibly Mamenchisaurus
 "Mtapaiasaurus" – nomen nudum, synonym of Giraffatitan
 "Mtotosaurus" – nomen nudum; Dicraeosaurus
 Murusraptor
 Mussaurus
 Muttaburrasaurus
 Muyelensaurus
 Mymoorapelta

N

 Naashoibitosaurus
 Nambalia
 Nankangia
 Nanningosaurus
 Nanosaurus
 Nanotyrannus – junior synonym of Tyrannosaurus
 Nanshiungosaurus
 Nanuqsaurus
 Nanyangosaurus
 Napaisaurus
 Narambuenatitan
 Narindasaurus
 Nasutoceratops
 Natovenator
 "Natronasaurus" – invalid name, either Alcovasaurus or Miragaia

 Navajoceratops 
 Nebulasaurus
 "Nectosaurus" – preoccupied name, now known as Kritosaurus
 Nedcolbertia
 Nedoceratops – possible junior synonym of Triceratops
 Neimongosaurus
 "Nemegtia" – preoccupied name, now known as Nemegtomaia
 Nemegtomaia
 Nemegtonykus
 Nemegtosaurus
 "Neosaurus" – preoccupied name; renamed Parrosaurus, which is now Hypsibema
 Neosodon
 Neovenator
 Neuquenraptor
 Neuquensaurus
 Nevadadromeus
 "Newtonsaurus" – nomen nudum, possibly Zanclodon
 "Ngexisaurus" – nomen nudum
 Ngwevu
 Nhandumirim
 Nicksaurus – nomen manuscriptum
 Niebla
 Nigersaurus
 Ningyuansaurus
 Ninjatitan
 Niobrarasaurus
 Nipponosaurus
 Noasaurus
 Nodocephalosaurus
 Nodosaurus
 Nomingia – possible junior synonym of Elmisaurus
 Nopcsaspondylus
 Normanniasaurus

 Notatesseraeraptor
 Nothronychus
 Notoceratops
 Notocolossus
 Notohypsilophodon
 Nqwebasaurus
 "Nteregosaurus" – nomen nudum; Janenschia
 Nullotitan
 "Nurosaurus" – nomen nudum
 Nuthetes
 Nyasasaurus — possibly non-dinosaurian 
 "Nyororosaurus" – nomen nudum; Dicraeosaurus

O

 Oceanotitan
 Ohmdenosaurus
 Ojoceratops – possible synonym of Eotriceratops
 Ojoraptorsaurus
 Oksoko
 Oligosaurus 
 Olorotitan
 Omeisaurus
 "Omosaurus" – preoccupied name, now known as Dacentrurus
 Ondogurvel
 Onychosaurus – junior synonym of Zalmoxes or Rhabdodon, or an ankylosaurian
 Oohkotokia
 Opisthocoelicaudia
 Oplosaurus
 "Orcomimus" – nomen nudum
 Orinosaurus – junior synonym (unneeded replacement name) of Orosaurus
 Orkoraptor
 Ornatops
 Ornatotholus – junior synonym of Stegoceras
 Ornithodesmus
 "Ornithoides" – nomen nudum; Saurornithoides
 Ornitholestes
 Ornithomerus 
 Ornithomimoides
 Ornithomimus
 Ornithopsis

 Ornithosuchus – subsequently found to be a non-dinosaurian archosaur
 Ornithotarsus – junior synonym of Hadrosaurus
 Orodromeus
 Orosaurus 
 Orthogoniosaurus
 Orthomerus
 Oryctodromeus
 "Oshanosaurus" – nomen nudum
 Osmakasaurus
 Ostafrikasaurus
 Ostromia 
 Othnielia – junior synonym of Nanosaurus
 Othnielosaurus – junior synonym of Nanosaurus
 Otogosaurus — possibly a nomen nudum
 Ouranosaurus
 Overoraptor
 Overosaurus
 Oviraptor
 "Ovoraptor" – nomen nudum; Velociraptor
 Owenodon
 Oxalaia – possible junior synonym of Spinosaurus
 Ozraptor

P

 Pachycephalosaurus
 Pachyrhinosaurus
 Pachysauriscus – junior synonym of Plateosaurus
 Pachysaurops – junior synonym of Plateosaurus
 "Pachysaurus" – preoccupied name, now known as Pachysauriscus; junior synonym of Plateosaurus
 Pachyspondylus – junior synonym of Massospondylus
 Pachysuchus
 Padillasaurus
 "Pakisaurus" – nomen nudum
 Palaeoctonus – subsequently found to be a phytosaur
 Palaeocursornis – subsequently found to be an azhdarchoid pterosaur
 "Palaeolimnornis" – nomen nudum; Palaeocursornis, pterodactyloid pterosaur belonging to Azhdarchoidea
 Palaeopteryx – possibly a bird
 Palaeosauriscus – junior synonym of Palaeosaurus
 Palaeosaurus – subsequently found to be a non-dinosaurian reptile
 "Palaeosaurus" – preoccupied name, now known as Sphenosaurus and considered to be a non-dinosaurian procolophonid
 Palaeoscincus
 Paleosaurus – subsequently found to be a non-dinosaurian archosaur; junior synonym (unneeded replacement name) of Palaeosaurus
 Paludititan
 Paluxysaurus – junior synonym of Sauroposeidon
 Pampadromaeus

 Pamparaptor
 Panamericansaurus
 Pandoravenator
 Panguraptor
 Panoplosaurus
 Panphagia
 Pantydraco – possible synonym of Thecodontosaurus
 Papiliovenator
 "Paraiguanodon" – nomen nudum; Bactrosaurus
 Paralitherizinosaurus
 Paralititan
 Paranthodon
 Pararhabdodon
 Parasaurolophus
 Paraxenisaurus
 Pareiasaurus – subsequently found to be a pareiasaur
 Pareisactus
 Parksosaurus
 Paronychodon
 Parrosaurus – now known as Hypsibema missouriensis
 Parvicursor
 Patagonykus
 Patagopelta
 Patagosaurus
 Patagotitan
 Pawpawsaurus
 Pectinodon
 Pedopenna 
 Pegomastax
 Peishansaurus
 Pekinosaurus – subsequently found to be a pseudosuchian; junior synonym of Revueltosaurus
 Pelecanimimus
 Pellegrinisaurus
 Peloroplites
 Pelorosaurus
 "Peltosaurus" – preoccupied name, now known as Sauropelta
 Pendraig
 Penelopognathus
 Pentaceratops

 Perijasaurus
 Petrobrasaurus
 Phaedrolosaurus
 Philovenator
 Phuwiangosaurus
 Phuwiangvenator
 Phyllodon
 Piatnitzkysaurus
 Picrodon – possibly non-dinosaurian
 Pilmatueia
 Pinacosaurus
 Pisanosaurus — possibly non-dinosaurian
 Pitekunsaurus
 Piveteausaurus
 Planicoxa
 Plateosauravus 
 Plateosaurus
 Platyceratops – possible junior synonym of Bagaceratops
 Platypelta
 Plesiohadros
 Pleurocoelus – possible junior synonym of Astrodon
 Pleuropeltus – junior synonym of Struthiosaurus
 Pneumatoarthrus – subsequently found to be a turtle
 Pneumatoraptor
 Podokesaurus
 Poekilopleuron
 Polacanthoides – possible junior synonym of Hylaeosaurus or Polacanthus
 Polacanthus
 Polyodontosaurus
 Polyonax
 Ponerosteus – subsequently found to be a non-dinosaurian archosaur
 Poposaurus – subsequently found to be a non-dinosaurian archosaur
 Portellsaurus
Postosuchus – subsequently found to be a rauisuchian
 Powellvenator
 Pradhania
 Prenocephale
 Prenoceratops
 Priconodon
 Priodontognathus

 Proa
 Probactrosaurus
 Probrachylophosaurus
 Proceratops – junior synonym (unneeded replacement name) of Ceratops
 Proceratosaurus
 Procerosaurus – subsequently found to be a tanystropheid protorosaur, Tanystropheus
 "Procerosaurus" – preoccupied name, now known as Ponerosteus
 Procheneosaurus – junior synonym of Lambeosaurus
 Procompsognathus
 Prodeinodon 
 "Proiguanodon" – nomen nudum; Iguanodon
 Propanoplosaurus
 Proplanicoxa – junior synonym of Mantellisaurus
 Prosaurolophus
 Protarchaeopteryx
 Protecovasaurus – subsequently found to be a non-dinosaurian archosauriform
 Protiguanodon – junior synonym of Psittacosaurus
 Protoavis – described as a bird, probably a chimera including theropod dinosaur bones
 Protoceratops
 Protognathosaurus
 "Protognathus" – preoccupied name, now known as Protognathosaurus
 Protohadros
 "Protorosaurus" – preoccupied name, now known as Chasmosaurus
 Protorosaurus – subsequently found to be a non-dinosaurian reptile
 "Proyandusaurus" – nomen nudum; Hexinlusaurus.
 Pseudolagosuchus – possibly non-dinosaurian; a junior synonym of Lewisuchus
 Psittacosaurus
 Pteropelyx
 Pterospondylus
 Puertasaurus
 Pukyongosaurus
 Pulanesaura
 Punatitan
 Pycnonemosaurus
 Pyroraptor

Q

 Qantassaurus

 Qianzhousaurus
 Qiaowanlong
 Qijianglong
 Qingxiusaurus
 Qinlingosaurus
 Qiupalong
 Qiupanykus
 Quaesitosaurus
 Quetecsaurus
 Quilmesaurus

R

 Rachitrema – subsequently found to be a chimera primarily based on ichthyosaur fossils
 Rahiolisaurus
 "Rahona" – preoccupied name, now known as Rahonavis
 Rahonavis – possibly a bird
 Rajasaurus
 Rapator
 Rapetosaurus
 Raptorex – possible junior synonym of Tarbosaurus
 Ratchasimasaurus
 Rativates
 Rayososaurus
 Razanandrongobe – subsequently found to be a crocodylomorph
 Rebbachisaurus
 Regaliceratops
 Regnosaurus
 Revueltosaurus – subsequently found to be a pseudosuchian
 Rhabdodon
 Rhadinosaurus – may be non-dinosaurian, possibly crocodilian
 Rhinorex – possible synonym of Gryposaurus
 Rhodanosaurus – junior synonym of Struthiosaurus
 Rhoetosaurus
 Rhomaleopakhus
 Rhopalodon – subsequently found to be a synapsid
 Riabininohadros 
 Richardoestesia

 "Rileya" – preoccupied name, now known as Rileyasuchus
 Rileyasuchus – subsequently found to be a phytosaur
 Rinchenia
 Rinconsaurus
 Rioarribasaurus – junior synonym of Coelophysis
 "Riodevasaurus" – nomen nudum; Turiasaurus
 Riojasaurus
 Riojasuchus – subsequently found to be a non-dinosaurian archosaur
 Riparovenator
 Rocasaurus
 "Roccosaurus" – nomen nudum; Melanorosaurus
 "Ronaldoraptor" – nomen nudum
Rubeosaurus – junior synonym of Styracosaurus
 Ruehleia
 Rugocaudia
 Rugops
 Ruixinia
 Rukwatitan
 Ruyangosaurus

S

 Sacisaurus – possibly non-dinosaurian
 Sahaliyania
 Saichania
 "Saldamosaurus" – nomen nudum
 "Salimosaurus" – nomen nudum, synonym of Giraffatitan
 Saltasaurus
 Saltopus – possibly non-dinosaurian
 "Saltriosaurus" – nomen nudum
 Saltriovenator
 "Sanchusaurus" – nomen nudum, possible Gallimimus
 "Sangonghesaurus" – nomen nudum, Tianchisaurus
 Sanjuansaurus 
 Sanpasaurus
 Santanaraptor
 Sanxiasaurus
 Sarahsaurus
 Saraikimasoom – nomen manuscriptum
 Sarcolestes
 Sarcosaurus
 Sarmientosaurus
 Saturnalia
 "Sauraechinodon" – nomen nudum; Echinodon

 "Sauraechmodon" – nomen nudum; Echinodon
 "Saurechinodon" – nomen nudum; Echinodon
 Saurolophus
 Sauroniops 
 Sauropelta
 Saurophaganax 
 "Saurophagus" – preoccupied name, now known as Saurophaganax
 Sauroplites
 Sauroposeidon
 Saurornithoides
 Saurornitholestes
 Savannasaurus
 Scansoriopteryx 
 Scaphonyx – subsequently found to be a rhynchosaur, Hyperodapedon
 Scelidosaurus
 Schleitheimia
 Scipionyx
 Sciurumimus
 Scleromochlus – subsequently found to be a non-dinosaurian avemetatarsalian
 Scolosaurus
 Scutellosaurus
 Secernosaurus
 Sefapanosaurus
 Segisaurus
 Segnosaurus
 Seismosaurus – junior synonym of Diplodocus
 Seitaad
 Sektensaurus
 "Selimanosaurus" – nomen nudum; Dicraeosaurus
 Sellacoxa – junior synonym of Barilium
 Sellosaurus – junior synonym of Plateosaurus
 Serendipaceratops
 Serikornis 
 Shamosaurus
 Shanag
 Shanshanosaurus – junior synonym of Tarbosaurus
 Shantungosaurus
 Shanxia
 Shanyangosaurus
 Shaochilong

 Shenzhousaurus
 Shidaisaurus
 Shingopana
 Shishugounykus
 Shixinggia
 Shri
 Shuangbaisaurus – possible synonym of Sinosaurus
 Shuangmiaosaurus
 Shunosaurus
 Shuvosaurus – subsequently found to be a rauisuchian
 Shuvuuia
 Siamodon
 "Siamodracon" – nomen nudum
 Siamosaurus
 Siamotyrannus
 Siamraptor
 Siats
 "Sibirosaurus" – nomen nudum, now known as Sibirotitan
 Sibirotitan
 "Sidormimus" – nomen nudum
Sierraceratops
 Sigilmassasaurus – possible junior synonym of Spinosaurus
 Silesaurus – possibly non-dinosaurian
 Siluosaurus
 Silutitan
 Silvisaurus
 Similicaudipteryx
 Sinankylosaurus
 Sinocalliopteryx
 Sinocephale 
 Sinoceratops
 Sinocoelurus
 "Sinopelta" – nomen nudum; synonym of Sinopeltosaurus
 "Sinopeltosaurus" – nomen nudum
 Sinopliosaurus – a pliosaur; one species, "S." fusuiensis, is actually a dinosaur that may be synonymous with Siamosaurus
 Sinornithoides

 Sinornithomimus
 Sinornithosaurus
 Sinosauropteryx
 Sinosaurus
 Sinotyrannus
 Sinovenator
 Sinraptor
 Sinusonasus
 Sirindhorna
 Skorpiovenator
 "Smilodon" – preoccupied name, now known as Zanclodon
 Smitanosaurus
 Smok — possibly non-dinosaurian
 Sonidosaurus
 Sonorasaurus
 Soriatitan
 Soumyasaurus – possibly non-dinosaurian
 Spectrovenator
 Sphaerotholus
 Sphenosaurus – subsequently found to be a non-dinosaurian reptile
 Sphenospondylus – junior synonym of Mantellisaurus
 Spiclypeus
 Spicomellus
 Spinophorosaurus
 Spinops
 Spinosaurus
 Spinostropheus
 Spinosuchus – subsequently found to be a non-dinosaurian reptile
 Spondylosoma – subsequently found to be an aphanosaur
 Squalodon – subsequently found to be a cetacean
 Staurikosaurus
 Stegoceras
 Stegopelta
 Stegosaurides
 Stegosaurus
 Stegouros
 Stellasaurus
 Stenonychosaurus

 Stenopelix
 Stenotholus – junior synonym of Stygimoloch, which is a possible junior synonym of Pachycephalosaurus
 Stephanosaurus
 "Stereocephalus" – preoccupied name, now known as Euoplocephalus
 Sterrholophus – junior synonym of Triceratops
 Stokesosaurus
 Stormbergia – junior synonym of Lesothosaurus
 Strenusaurus – junior synonym of Riojasaurus
 Streptospondylus
 Struthiomimus
 Struthiosaurus
 Stygimoloch – junior synonym of Pachycephalosaurus
 Stygivenator – junior synonym of Tyrannosaurus
 Styracosaurus
 Succinodon – subsequently found to be fossilized mollusc borings
 Suchomimus
 Suchoprion – subsequently found to be a phytosaur
 Suchosaurus – possible synonym of Baryonyx
 "Sugiyamasaurus" – nomen nudum
 "Sulaimanisaurus" – nomen nudum
 Supersaurus
 Suskityrannus
 Suuwassea
 Suzhousaurus
 Symphyrophus – junior synonym of Camptosaurus
 Syngonosaurus 
 "Syntarsus" – preoccupied name, sometimes assigned to Coelophysis or Megapnosaurus
 Syrmosaurus – junior synonym of Pinacosaurus
 Szechuanosaurus

T

 Tachiraptor

 Talarurus
 Talenkauen
 Talos
 Tamarro
 Tambatitanis
 Tangvayosaurus
 Tanius
 Tanycolagreus
 Tanystropheus – subsequently found to be a protorosaur
 Tanystrosuchus
 Taohelong
 Tapinocephalus – subsequently found to be a therapsid
 Tapuiasaurus
 Tarascosaurus
 Tarbosaurus
 Tarchia
 Tastavinsaurus
 Tatankacephalus
 Tatankaceratops – probable junior synonym of Triceratops
 Tataouinea
 Tatisaurus
 Taurovenator 
 Taveirosaurus
 Tawa 
 Tawasaurus – junior synonym of Lufengosaurus
 Tazoudasaurus
 Technosaurus – possibly non-dinosaurian
 Tecovasaurus – subsequently found to be a non-dinosaurian archosauriform
 Tehuelchesaurus
 "Teihivenator" – nomen nudum
 Teinurosaurus
 Teleocrater – subsequently found to be a basal avemetatarsalian
 Telmatosaurus
 "Tenantosaurus" – nomen nudum; Tenontosaurus
 "Tenchisaurus" – nomen nudum;  an unpublished museum name for Tianchisaurus
 Tendaguria
 Tengrisaurus
 Tenontosaurus
 Teratophoneus
 Teratosaurus – subsequently found to be a non-dinosaurian archosaur
 Termatosaurus – subsequently found to be a phytosaur
 Terminocavus

 Tethyshadros
 Tetragonosaurus – junior synonym of Lambeosaurus
 Texacephale
 Texasetes
 Teyuwasu – possibly junior synonym of Staurikosaurus
 Thanatotheristes 
 Thanos
 Thecocoelurus
 Thecodontosaurus
 Thecospondylus
 Theiophytalia
 Therizinosaurus
 Therosaurus – a synonym of Iguanodon
 Thescelosaurus
 Thespesius
 "Thotobolosaurus" – nomen nudum; Kholumolumo
 Tianchiasaurus – alternate spelling of Tianchisaurus
 Tianchisaurus 
 "Tianchungosaurus" – nomen nudum; Dianchungosaurus (crocodilian)
 Tianyulong
 Tianyuraptor
 Tianzhenosaurus
 Tichosteus
 Tienshanosaurus
 Timimus
 Timurlengia
 Titanoceratops
 Titanosaurus
 "Titanosaurus" – preoccupied name, now known as Atlantosaurus
 Tlatolophus
 Tochisaurus
 "Tomodon" – preoccupied name, now known as Diplotomodon
Tonganosaurus
 Tongtianlong
 "Tonouchisaurus" – nomen nudum
 Torilion – junior synonym of Barilium
 Tornieria
 Torosaurus

 Torvosaurus
 Tototlmimus
 Trachodon 
 Tralkasaurus
 Transylvanosaurus
 Tratayenia
 Traukutitan
 Trialestes – subsequently found to be a basal crocodylomorph
 "Triassolestes" – preoccupied name, now known as Trialestes
 Tribelesodon – junior synonym of Tanystropheus, a protorosaur
 Triceratops
 Trierarchuncus
 Trigonosaurus
 Trimucrodon
 Trinisaura
 Triunfosaurus
 Troodon
 Tsaagan
 Tsagantegia
 Tsintaosaurus
 Tuebingosaurus
 Tugulusaurus
 Tuojiangosaurus
 Turanoceratops
 Turiasaurus
 Tylocephale
 Tylosteus – synonym of Pachycephalosaurus
 Tyrannosaurus
 Tyrannotitan

U

 Uberabatitan
 "Ubirajara" – nomen nudum
 Udanoceratops
 Ugrosaurus – junior synonym of Triceratops
 Ugrunaaluk – junior synonym of Edmontosaurus
 Uintasaurus – junior synonym of Camarasaurus
 Ultrasauros – junior synonym of Supersaurus
 "Ultrasaurus" – preoccupied name, renamed Ultrasauros which is now a junior synonym of Supersaurus
 Ultrasaurus
 Ulughbegsaurus
 "Umarsaurus" – nomen nudum; Barsboldia
 Unaysaurus
 Unenlagia
 Unescoceratops
 "Unicerosaurus" – nomen nudum,  subsequently found to be a fish
 Unquillosaurus
 Urbacodon
 Utahceratops
 Utahraptor
 Uteodon

V

 Vagaceratops
 Vahiny
 Valdoraptor – possible synonym of Thecocoelurus
 Valdosaurus
 Vallibonavenatrix
 Variraptor
 Vayuraptor
 Vectaerovenator
 Vectensia – junior synonym of Polacanthus or Hylaeosaurus
 Vectiraptor

 Vectisaurus – junior synonym of Mantellisaurus
 Velafrons
 Velocipes
 Velociraptor
 Velocisaurus
 Venaticosuchus – subsequently found to be a non-dinosaurian archosaur
 Venenosaurus
 Vespersaurus
 Veterupristisaurus
 Viavenator
 "Vitakridrinda" – nomen nudum
 "Vitakrisaurus" – nomen nudum
 Volgatitan
 Volkheimeria
 Vouivria
 Vulcanodon

W

 Wadhurstia – junior synonym of Hypselospinus
 Wakinosaurus
 Walgettosuchus – possible synonym of Rapator
 "Walkeria" – preoccupied name, now known as Alwalkeria 
 "Walkersaurus" – nomen nudum; Duriavenator
 Wamweracaudia
 "Wangonisaurus" – nomen nudum, synonym of Giraffatitan
 Wannanosaurus
 Weewarrasaurus

 Wellnhoferia – subsequently found to be a bird, possible junior synonym of Archaeopteryx
 Wendiceratops
 Wiehenvenator
 Willinakaqe
Wintonotitan
 Wuerhosaurus
 Wulagasaurus
 Wulatelong
 Wulong
 Wyleyia – possibly a bird
 "Wyomingraptor" – nomen nudum, synonym of Allosaurus

X

 Xenoceratops
 Xenoposeidon
 Xenotarsosaurus
 Xianshanosaurus
 Xiaosaurus

 Xiaotingia
 Xingtianosaurus
 Xingxiulong
 Xinjiangovenator
 Xinjiangtitan
 Xiongguanlong
 Xixianykus
 Xixiasaurus
 Xixiposaurus
 Xiyunykus
 Xuanhanosaurus
 Xuanhuaceratops
 "Xuanhuasaurus" – nomen nudum; Xuanhuaceratops
 Xunmenglong
 Xuwulong

Y

 Yaleosaurus – junior synonym of Anchisaurus
 Yamaceratops
 Yamanasaurus
 Yamatosaurus
 Yandusaurus
 Yangchuanosaurus
 Yaverlandia
 Yehuecauhceratops
 "Yezosaurus" – nomen nudum; subsequently found to be a junior synonym of the mosasaur Taniwhasaurus
 Yi 
 "Yibinosaurus" – nomen nudum

 Yimenosaurus
 Yingshanosaurus
 Yinlong
 Yixianosaurus 
 Yizhousaurus 
 Yongjinglong
 Ypupiara
 "Yuanmouraptor" – nomen nudum
 Yuanmousaurus
 Yueosaurus
 Yulong
 Yunganglong
 Yunmenglong
 Yunnanosaurus
 "Yunxianosaurus" – nomen nudum
 Yunyangosaurus
 Yurgovuchia
 Yutyrannus
 Yuxisaurus
 Yuzhoulong

Z

 Zalmoxes
 Zanabazar
 Zanclodon – subsequently found to be non-dinosaurian
 Zapalasaurus
 Zapsalis
 Zaraapelta
 Zatomus – subsequently found to be a non-dinosaurian archosaur
 Zby
 Zephyrosaurus
 Zhanghenglong
 Zhejiangosaurus
 Zhenyuanlong

 Zhongjianosaurus
 Zhongornis – possibly a bird
 Zhongyuansaurus  – possible junior synonym of Gobisaurus
 Zhuchengceratops
 Zhuchengosaurus – junior synonym of Shantungosaurus
 Zhuchengtitan
 Zhuchengtyrannus
 Ziapelta
 Zigongosaurus 
 Zizhongosaurus
 Zuniceratops
 "Zunityrannus" – nomen nudum, Suskityrannus
 Zuolong
 Zuoyunlong
 Zupaysaurus
 Zuul

See also

 Dinosaur classification
 List of birds
 List of bird genera
 List of dinosaur ichnogenera
 List of informally named dinosaurs
 List of ichthyosaur genera
 List of Mesozoic birds
 List of mosasaur genera
 List of pelycosaurs
 List of plesiosaur genera
 List of pterosaur genera
 List of therapsids
 List of South American dinosaurs
 List of North American dinosaurs
 List of African dinosaurs
 List of Asian dinosaurs
 List of European dinosaurs
 List of Indian and Madagascan dinosaurs
 List of Australian and Antarctic dinosaurs
 List of commonly used taxonomic affixes

Notes 
 Most uncited genus names are taken from Olshevsky's "Dinosaur Genera List". Non-dinosaur dinosauromorphs and non-avebrevicaudan avialans are also listed by Olshevsky, but are omitted from this list as they are not considered "non-avian dinosaurs" in most published sources.

References 
 Lambert, D. (1993). "A to Z of Dinosaurs" In: The Ultimate Dinosaur Book. Dorling Kindersley, 192 pp. 
 Olshevsky, G. (1995–2021). Dinosaur Genera List . Retrieved July 30, 2013.
 Walters, M. & J. Paker (1995). Dictionary of Prehistoric Life. Claremont Books. .
 Weishampel, D.B., P. Dodson & H. Osmólska (eds.) (2004). The Dinosauria, Second Edition. University of California Press, 861 pp. .

Dinosaurs

Dinosaurs